"30 de Febrero" is a song by American duo Ha*Ash for their fifth studio album of the same name (2017). A live version was included on their album Ha*Ash: En Vivo (2019). It was written by Ashley Grace, Hanna Nicole, Santiago Hernández and Rafael Vergara while the song was produced by Hanna Nicole and George Noriega and features guest vocals by Spanish singer Abraham Mateo.

Background and composition 
The track was released digitally on November 24, 2017, by Sony Music Entertainment México as a promotional tool for the album, which was released on seven days. The song is a break up song and has a colorful vibe with having Abraham Mateo their ex lover who is wanting another chance. The song is a classy and upbeat.

The band started working on the song during the 1F Hecho Realidad Tour. "30 de Febrero" it was written by Ashley Grace, Hanna Nicole, Abraham Mateo, Santiago Hernández and Rafael Vergara, while the song was produced by Hanna and George Noriega. The song was recorded at Miami, United States in 2017. The music official video for the song hasn't been released.

Commercial performance 
On  February 1, 2019, the song was certified gold in México.

Music video 
A lyric video for "30 de Febrero" featuring Abraham Mateo was released on November 24, 2017. It was directed by Diego Álvarez. , the video has over 101 million views on YouTube.

The music video for "Ojalá", recorded live for the live album Ha*Ash: En Vivo, was released on December 6, 2019. The video was filmed in Auditorio Nacional, Mexico City.

Live performances 
Ha*Ash included "30 de Febrero" on her "Gira 100 Años Contigo" (2018–2019) as the finish track.

Credits and personnel 
Credits adapted from Genius.

Recording and management

 Recording Country: United States
 Sony / ATV Discos Music Publishing LLC / Westwood Publishing
 (P) 2017 Sony Music Entertainment México, S.A. De C.V.

Ha*Ash
 Ashley Grace  – vocals, guitar, songwriting
 Hanna Nicole  – vocals, guitar, songwriting, production
Additional personnel
 Santiago Hernández  – songwriting, editor, keyboards
 Abraham Mateo  – songwriting
 Rafael Vergara  – songwriting, editor
 Rob Welss  – editor, keyboards
 George Noriega  – engineer, editor, director, keyboards
 Pate Wallace  – engineer
 Diego Contento  – engineerr
 Dave Clauss  – engineer
 Matt Calderín  – drums

Certifications

Release history

References 

Ha*Ash songs
Songs written by Ashley Grace
Songs written by Hanna Nicole
Song recordings produced by George Noriega
2017 songs
Spanish-language songs
Sony Music Latin singles
Songs written by Abraham Mateo